Carl Bernard Rubin (March 27, 1920 – August 2, 1995) was a United States district judge of the United States District Court for the Southern District of Ohio.

Education and career

Born in Cincinnati, Ohio, Rubin received a Bachelor of Arts degree from the University of Cincinnati in 1942 and a Bachelor of Laws from the University of Cincinnati College of Law in 1944. He was in private practice in Cincinnati from 1944 to 1971, working as an assistant prosecuting attorney of Hamilton County, Ohio from 1950 to 1960.

Federal judicial service

On April 29, 1971, Rubin was nominated by President Richard Nixon to a new seat on the United States District Court for the Southern District of Ohio created by 84 Stat. 294. He was confirmed by the United States Senate on May 20, 1971, and received his commission the same day. He served as Chief Judge from 1979 to 1990. His service terminated on August 2, 1995, due to his death of cancer in Cincinnati.

See also
List of Jewish American jurists

References

Sources
 

1920 births
1995 deaths
Judges of the United States District Court for the Southern District of Ohio
United States district court judges appointed by Richard Nixon
20th-century American judges
20th-century American lawyers
University of Cincinnati alumni
University of Cincinnati College of Law alumni